Pedro Enrique Sarmiento Solís  (born 26 October 1956) is a Colombian football manager and former player. He is the current manager of Categoría Primera A club Once Caldas.

Playing career

Club
Born in Medellín, Sarmiento played for Atlético Nacional and América de Cali during his professional career. After winning several national club titles he became a trainer. In 2004, he won the fourth title for Independiente Medellín.

International
Sarmiento made 37 appearances for the senior Colombia national football team from 1980 to 1985, including participating in nine qualifying matches for the 1982 and 1986 FIFA World Cups and the 1983 Copa América.

He also played for Colombia at the 1980 Olympic Games in the Moscow.

Managerial career
After retiring from playing, Sarmiento began coaching football. He has led Deportivo Cali, América de Cali, Santa Fe, Independiente Medellín and Cúcuta Deportivo.

References

External links

1956 births
Living people
Colombian footballers
Footballers from Medellín
Colombia international footballers
Footballers at the 1980 Summer Olympics
Olympic footballers of Colombia
1983 Copa América players
Categoría Primera A players
Atlético Nacional footballers
América de Cali footballers
Colombian football managers
Deportivo Cali managers
América de Cali managers
Independiente Santa Fe managers
Independiente Medellín managers
Envigado F.C. managers
Deportivo Pereira managers
Association football midfielders
Atlético Nacional managers
Águilas Doradas Rionegro managers
Once Caldas managers